Alexander Dunbar Winchester (also known as Alexander Winster) (1625–1708) was a Roman Catholic clergyman who served as the Prefect of Scotland.

Born in Garmouth, Moray, in 1625, he took the oath in the Scots College in Rome on 21 May 1651, and for the next seven years studied philosophy and theology. He was ordained a priest in the Scots College on 21 May 1656. He was appointed the Prefect of Scotland by the Holy See on 12 June 1662. He resigned in 1668, but was reappointed again in 1672, only to resign again in July 1693. He died on 14 January 1708, aged 83.

References

1618 births
1661 deaths
Scottish Roman Catholics
Scottish Roman Catholic priests
People from Moray
17th-century Scottish people
Apostolic prefects